Mitryayevo (Miträy) is a rural locality (a village) in Irsayevsky Selsoviet, Mishkinsky District, Bashkortostan, Russia. The population was 254 as of 2010. There are 5 streets.

Geography 
Mitryayevo is located 6 km north of Mishkino (the district's administrative centre) by road. Irsayevo is the nearest rural locality.

References 

Rural localities in Mishkinsky District